Allahverdi Khan (c. 1560 – 1613) was an Iranian general and statesman.

Allahverdi Khan may also refer to:

 Allahverdi Khan (Armenian) 
 Allahverdi Khan Bridge 
 Allah Verdi Khan